Virgibacillus halophilus is a Gram-positive, round-spore-forming, rod-shaped and halophilic bacterium from the genus of Virgibacillus which has been isolated from field soil from Kakegawa in Japan.

References

Bacillaceae
Bacteria described in 2007